The City School District of New Rochelle is a public school district located in New Rochelle, New York. New Rochelle has one of the most extensive educational systems in Westchester County, comprising a high school, two middle schools, six elementary schools, and one pre-k through second grade Early Childhood Center. The district enrollment is 10,584 students in 10 schools in grades Pre-K through 12th grade. The annual budget was $210,748,000 in 2007, with a per-pupil expenditure of $19,017.

Schools in the district have received the Blue Ribbon Award from the U.S. Department of Education on multiple occasions, including in 1983, 1984, 1993, 1994, 1995, 1996 and 1998.

New Rochelle has also been named one of the "Best 100 Communities for Music Education" in the nation by the American Music Conference. In 2007 the Westchester Arts Council presented the district with its "Arts Award for Education" in recognition of the City and school district’s extraordinary commitment to the arts.

History

New Rochelle was the scene of the first court-ordered school desegregation case in "the North" when the United States Supreme Court decided in 1962 that its Lincoln School boundaries had been intentionally drawn to create segregated elementary school districts. Lincoln School was closed and demolished in 1965, with students of that district allowed to attend other elementary schools in the city. The school district is known for its diversity, and the high school honors civil rights leader Whitney Young in the name of its auditorium and civil rights martyr Michael Schwerner in the name of its library.

In May 1968, New Rochelle High School was partially destroyed by a fire set by a disturbed student. The fire occurred early in the morning and there were no fatalities. The facade of the school remained intact, allowing builders to construct a new building behind the original exterior.

Brian Osborne became superintendent in 2014.
He left the position in 2018.

Notable alumni

Notable alumni sorted by graduation date.

Edward A. Batchelor (Unknown graduation date), sportswriter and charter member of the Baseball Writers' Association of America
Elia Kazan 1926 - Academy Award-winning director<ref name=CB>{{Cite book |title=Current Biography Yearbook |place=New York |publisher=H. W. Wilson Company |year=1971 |page=24}}</ref>
James Gregory 1930 - stage, screen and TV actor
Marion West Higgins 1932 - first female Speaker of the New Jersey General Assembly
Henry Heimlich 1937 - inventor of the Heimlich Maneuver
Gloria Oden 1939 - African American poet
Don Hewitt 1940 - producer of 60 MinutesJerome Kohlberg, Jr. 1943 - billionaire, and co-founder of private equity firms KKR and Kohlberg & Co.
Lou Jones 1950 - Olympic gold medalist
Louis Rukeyser 1950 - TV personality, economic commentator
Jesse Arnelle 1950 - football and basketball player at Penn State University
Leslie H. Gelb 1955 - President of the Council on Foreign Relations
Harry Macklowe 1955 - Chairman and CEO of Macklowe Properties Real Estate Investment
William S. Rukeyser 1957 - journalist
Johnny Counts 1958 - played professional football for the New York Giants
Drew S. Days, III 1959 - Solicitor General of the United States, Professor of Law at Yale Law School
Lawrence M. Small 1959 - 11th Secretary of the Smithsonian Institution
Richard Roundtree 1961 - actor - John Shaft
Barrie M. Osborne 1962 - 2004 Academy Award-winning film producer (Lord of the Rings'')
Claude "Butch" Harmon, Jr. 1962 - golf professional and former coach of Tiger Woods
Andrea Mitchell 1963 - journalist
Russell T. Lewis 1965 - CEO of The New York Times Company
George Starke 1966 - Washington Redskins - Tackle - "Head Hog" 
Alan Menken 1967 - composer, lyricist
Jeralyn Merritt 1967 - criminal defense attorney, legal analyst, blogger
Guy Davis 1970 - musician, son of actors Ossie Davis and Ruby Dee
Gloria Borger 1970 - CBS special correspondent
Christopher Edley, Jr. 1970 - Dean of University of California, Berkeley School of Law (Boalt Hall)
Michael Kaiser 1971 - President of the John F. Kennedy Center for the Performing Arts
Glynnis O'Connor 1973 - actress
Rachel Vail 1984 - children's author
Clifford J. Levy 1985 - Pulitzer Prize-winning journalist
Craig Carton 1987 - sports radio personality
Devon Hughes 1990 - professional wrestler known as "Brother Devon" (formerly known as "D-Von Dudley")
Cristina Teuscher 1996 - Olympic gold medalist swimmer
Jennifer Hyman 1998 - entrepreneur
Tom Koehler 2004 - Miami Marlins Pitcher
Courtney Greene 2005 - Jacksonville Jaguars free safety
Ray Rice 2005 - Baltimore Ravens Running back. Reserve on 2009 AFC Pro Bowl team. Super Bowl XLVII champion
Edson Buddle - US National Soccer Team

Schools

High schools
 New Rochelle High School
 St. Gabriel's Alternative Campus High School (until 2020)
 In 2022, a new space for the Alternative Campus High School was opened in May 2022 at 140 Huguenot Street, on the campus of Monroe College in New Rochelle.  61 students are currently enrolled there.

Middle schools
 Albert Leonard Middle School - students from Daniel Webster Elementary School, George M. Davis Elementary School, and William B. Ward Elementary School
 Isaac E. Young Middle School - students from Columbus Elementary School, Jefferson Elementary School, and Trinity Elementary School

Elementary schools
    
 Jefferson Elementary School
 George M. Davis Elementary School
 Trinity Elementary School
 William B. Ward Elementary School
 Daniel Webster Elementary School - offers a Humanities magnet program
 Columbus Elementary School - offers a Science, Math and Technology magnet program
 Henry Barnard Early Childhood Center -  offers a magnet program for pre-kindergarten through Second grade students, following the Reggio Emilia approach, and houses the district's Pre-School Speech Language Learning Center. Enrollment was 622 students in 2005-2006.

References

External links
City School District of New Rochelle
 New Rochelle High School Fire of 1968 (relates the story of the fire and its consequences with both text and an extensive collection of historic photographs)

Education in New Rochelle, New York
New Rochelle
New Rochelle